Victor Daniels (April 12, 1899 – December 1, 1955), known professionally as Chief Thundercloud, was an American character actor in Westerns. He is noted for being the first actor to play the role of Tonto, the Lone Ranger's Native-American companion, on the screen.

Family and education
Information available about Daniels is limited and vague. He repeatedly said he was born in the Oklahoma Territory. But his Social Security application lists his birth date as April 12, 1899, and his birthplace as Santa Cruz County in the Arizona Territory. He listed his parents as Jesus Daniels and Tomaca Daniels.

Daniels claimed to be Cherokee, though he does not appear in tribal rolls of the period. He had a sister named Anita, born October 6, 1911, in Tucson, Pima County, Arizona Territory. On her birth certificate she listed similar parents with Jesus Daniel (born in Sonora) and Tomaso Acuna (born in Arizona).

Thundercloud's first marriage was to 17-year-old Mildred Turner (from Missouri) on May 26, 1925, in Los Angeles. At that time, he called himself “Victor Vasquez.” Their son Victor Junior Daniels was born on May 7, 1926, and a second son, Norman Daniels, on September 5, 1927, both in Los Angeles. Thundercloud divorced Mildred and later married Frances Courtright on April 26, 1933.

His Lone Ranger press biography claimed he was derived from the "Muskogee aristocracy"[sic]—but the concept of European "royalty" and "aristocrats" is foreign to Native American cultures. He was actually the first of nine children born to Jesus and Tomaca Daniels (as indicated on his Social Security application). The pressbook for The Lone Ranger Rides Again announced his parents as "Dark Cloud and Morning Star, aristocrats of the Muskogee tribe" [sic], while his death certificate lists his father as Joseph Mahawa.

Raised on a ranch in Arizona, he claimed to have attended the University of Arizona at Tucson, where he "excelled scholastically and in athletics (football, boxing)." However, no record exists of his enrollment or attendance at the school under the name Daniels or any other name he used.

Work as a character actor

Daniels worked many jobs — cowboy on cattle ranches, miner, rodeo performer, and tour guide — before he went to Hollywood to try his luck at acting. Daniels started as a stuntman. From there he graduated to character actor status. His title "Chief" was a Hollywood invention, a stage name. He had the title role in Geronimo (1939) and played Tonto in both Republic Lone Ranger serials, The Lone Ranger (1938) and The Lone Ranger Rides Again (1939).

Throughout the 1940s, Daniels continued to work as a character actor, maintaining the Chief Thundercloud persona. In most of the films in which he was featured, he played an antagonist opposing the white protagonist. For example, in the film "Young Buffalo Bill" (1940) he played Akuna, a renegade Native American chief who commits murder while working as a hired hand. In the film Renegade Girl (1946), he played the main villain, Chief Whitecloud, a vengeful antagonist with a vendetta against the protagonist's family.

Although featured in a number of films, Daniels was uncredited in some films, such as Gun Smoke (1936), a film about a ranch defending itself from a flood of sheep. He also appeared in the first two parts of the serial Custer's Last Stand (1936), again uncredited.

Daniels had a short appearance on early television on The Gene Autry Show (1950). Daniels appeared as Chief Thundercloud in the 1954 episode "The Saint's Portrait" of the syndicated anthology series Death Valley Days hosted by Stanley Andrews. One of his last appearances was on March 1, 1955, as the Apache Geronimo in the premiere of the syndicated television series Buffalo Bill, Jr..

Legal problems and later years
According to the Los Angeles Daily News, Daniels was fined $200 and sentenced to four years of probation in 1951 after he pleaded guilty to violating the Corporate Security Act. He was told to make restitution of $5,625 to his victims after he had sold them shares in films without a permit. During his final years, he worked with other western actors performing in live shows at the Corriganville Movie Ranch, now the Corriganville Regional Park, near Simi Valley, California.

Death
Victor Daniels died at age 56 following surgery for stomach cancer in Ventura County, California, on December 1, 1955. He was survived by his wife, Frances. He was buried in Forest Lawn Memorial Park in Glendale, near Los Angeles. His last film role was in the John Wayne film The Searchers (1956), which was released after his death.

The Lone Ranger and legacy

After working for some time as a stuntman and in bit parts, it was Daniels' portrayal of the character Tonto in the serial The Lone Ranger (1938) that was to be his legacy. This is perhaps where he gained the most recognition as a character actor." That same year, he had a small villain-like role in the first part of Flaming Frontiers, a 15-part cliffhanger about murder and double cross. The following year, Thundercloud reprised his role as the Lone Ranger’s sidekick in The Lone Ranger Rides Again.

Selected filmography

Rustlers of Red Dog (1935, serial) – Chief Grey Wolf
Cyclone of the Saddle (1935) – Thundercloud
Wagon Trail (1935) – Henchman
Rustler's Paradise (1935) – Henchman
Gun Smoke (1935) – Sheep Herder
Fighting Pioneers (1935) – Eagle Feathers
Saddle Aces (1935) – Canejo Rider Jose
The Farmer Takes a Wife (1935) – Indian Chief
The Singing Vagabond (1935) – Young Deer
Custer's Last Stand (1936, serial) – Young Wolf
Silly Billies (1936) – Indian
For the Service (1936) – Indian Brave
Ramona (1936) – Pablo
Ride, Ranger, Ride (1936) – Little Wolf
The Plainsman (1936) – Indian #5 with Painted Horse
The Bold Caballero (1936) – Zorro's aide
Riders of the Whistling Skull (1937) – High Priest
Wild West Days (1937) – Indian
Renfrew of the Royal Mounted (1937) – Indian Henchman
The Lone Ranger (1938, serial) – Tonto
The Great Adventures of Wild Bill Hickok (1938, serial) – Chief Gray Eagle [Chs. 3, 14]
Flaming Frontiers (1938, serial) – Thunder Cloud
The Law West of Tombstone (1938) – Chief Little Dog
The Lone Ranger Rides Again (1939, Serial) – Tonto
Union Pacific (1939) – Cherokee Indian
Man of Conquest (1939) – Cherokee Indian
The Cat and the Canary (1939) – Indian Guide
Fighting Mad (1939) – Indian
Geronimo (1939) – Geronimo
Murder on the Yukon (1940) – Manti – Henchman
Young Buffalo Bill (1940) – Akuna
Typhoon (1940) – Kehi
Wyoming (1940) – Lightfoot
North West Mounted Police (1940) – Wandering Spirit
Hi-Yo Silver (1940) – (archive footage)
Hudson's Bay (1941) – Orimha
Western Union (1941) – Indian Leader
Pirates on Horseback (1941) – Flying Cloud
Silver Stallion (1941) – Freshwater
Shut My Big Mouth (1942) – Indian Interpreter
My Gal Sal (1942) – Murphy
Lady in a Jam (1942) – Thundercloud
King of the Stallions (1942) – Hahawi
Overland Mail (1942) – Chief Many Moons [Ch. 13]
The Valley of Vanishing Men (1942, serial) – Chief Tall Tree (ch. 9)
Daredevils of the West (1943, serial) – Indian Chief [Ch. 8, 9]
The Law Rides Again (1943) – Thundercloud
The Fighting Seabees (1944) – Indian Seabee
Buffalo Bill (1944) – Crazy Horse
Outlaw Trail (1944) – Chief
Sonora Stagecoach (1944) – Chief Thunder Cloud
Raiders of Ghost City (1944, serial) – Chief Tahona
Black Arrow (1944, serial) – Tribal Medicine Man
Nob Hill (1945) – Indian Chief
The Phantom Rider (1946, serial) – Chief Yellow Wolf
Romance of the West (1946) – Chief Eagle Feather
Badman's Territory (1946) – Chief Tahlequah
Renegade Girl (1946) – Chief White Cloud
Unconquered (1947) – Chief Killbuck
The Prairie (1947) – Eagle Feather
The Senator Was Indiscreet (1947) – Indian
Blazing Across the Pecos (1948) – Chief Bear Claw
Call of the Forest (1949) – Stormcloud
Mrs. Mike (1949) – Indian
The Traveling Saleswoman (1950) – Running Deer
Davy Crockett, Indian Scout (1950) – Sleeping Fox
Ambush (1950) – Tana
A Ticket to Tomahawk (1950) – Crooked Knife
Colt .45 (1950) – Walking Bear
The Iroquois Trail (1950) – Ottawa Chief
I Killed Geronimo (1950) – Geronimo
Indian Territory (1950) – Indian
Last of the Buccaneers (1950) – Indian Leader on Galveston Island
Santa Fe (1951) – Chief Longfeather
Buffalo Bill in Tomahawk Territory (1952) – Black Hawk
The Half-Breed (1952) – Apache
The Searchers (1956) – Comanche Chief

References

External links

Chief Thundercloud at B-Westerns
Chief Thundercloud at What-a-Character

1890s births
1955 deaths
People from Muskogee, Oklahoma
Male Western (genre) film actors
Male film serial actors
University of Arizona alumni
Deaths from cancer in California
Burials at Forest Lawn Memorial Park (Glendale)
American people of Native American descent
20th-century American male actors